Ravé Mehta is an American engineer, author, musician, artist and philanthropist. He is of Indian descent (region).

Mehta is the founder of Helios Entertainment and Helios Interactive, a 3D game development and technology company. He is also the Managing Director of MEHTA Group, 40-year transportation infrastructure holding company.

He is also half of a brother-sister Electronic dance music group Renaiszance. Their 
first full album was released in April 2013.

Mehta is on the Wall Street Journal's 2003 Business Men of the Year list as the engineer and entrepreneur who pioneered the experiential learning technology approach originally used for DoD simulation and training. Mehta has coached entrepreneurs and executives in reaching a state of flourishing through active action and perseverance.

He was also named on one of the 100 Most Influential People in Central Florida published by the Orlando Business Journal in 2001.

Mehta is the author of The Inventor: The Story of Tesla graphic novel, published by Scholastic, which chronicles the journey of physicist Nikola Tesla.  "The novel follows the inventor from his origins in Serbia through his immigration to the United States and his rivalry with inventor Thomas Edison."

After publishing his Graphic novel, Mehta formed Renaiszance a brother-sister Electronic dance music group. Their first full album was released in April 2013.

Mehta has garnered recognition in numerous media outlets including:

100 Most Influential People in Central Florida published by the Orlando Business Journal in 2001
2008 Featured Artist in the Q Gallery in Orlando, Fl
2009 City of Orlando featured artist
Wall Street Journal in its 2003 Business Men of the Year list

References 

American businesspeople
Living people
Year of birth missing (living people)